The 1885 Southern Maori by-election was a by-election held on 10 June 1885 in the  electorate during the 9th New Zealand Parliament.

The by-election was caused by the resignation of the incumbent, Hōri Kerei Taiaroa, when he was re-appointed to the Legislative Council.

Taiaroa has been appointed to the Legislative Council in February 1879, but in August 1880 had been disqualified over a technicality, a cause of bitterness and resentment among Māori. 
When appointed by Sir George Grey Taiaroa held (and continued to hold) a salaried (government) office, hence was not eligible to sit in the Council, despite having attended three sessions.

The by-election was won by Tame Parata.

Results

References

Southern Maori 1885
1885 elections in New Zealand
Māori politics